Richmond Francis Lionel Hanna (26 February 1913 – 17 January 1985) was an insurance salesman, a Flight Lieutenant in the Royal Canadian Airforce, a member of Edmonton Municipal Council and served as a Canadian federal politician from 1953 to 1957.

Born in Monaghan, Republic of Ireland, Hanna first ran for a seat in the House of Commons of Canada in the 1953 Canadian federal election. He defeated former Member of Parliament Orvis A. Kennedy to win the new riding of Edmonton—Strathcona. Kennedy would run for re-election in the 1957 Canadian federal election and be defeated by Social Credit candidate Sydney Herbert Thompson. Hanna would run for office 1 more time in the 1958 Canadian federal election but be defeated by Progressive Conservative candidate Terry Nugent.

External links
 

1913 births
1985 deaths
Members of the House of Commons of Canada from Alberta
Liberal Party of Canada MPs
Royal Canadian Air Force personnel of World War II
Royal Canadian Air Force officers
Edmonton city councillors
Irish emigrants to Canada
Politicians from County Monaghan
People from Monaghan (town)